Forchhammeria is a genus of plants in the order Brassicales.  This genus has previously been placed in the Stixaceae (now obsolete) and Capparaceae, but under the APG IV system is now included in the family Resedaceae.  Species can be found in Central America and the Caribbean.

Species
The Catalogue of Life lists:
 Forchhammeria brevipes
 Forchhammeria emarginata
 Forchhammeria haitiensis
 Forchhammeria hintonii
 Forchhammeria iltisii
 Forchhammeria laxiflora
 Forchhammeria longifolia
 Forchhammeria macrocarpa
 Forchhammeria pallida
 Forchhammeria polyandra
 Forchhammeria sessilifolia
 Forchhammeria sphaerocarpa
 Forchhammeria trifoliata
 Forchhammeria watsonii

References

Resedaceae
Flora of Central America
Brassicales genera